The South Carolina Western Railway was a Southeastern railroad that operated in the early 20th century.

History 
The South Carolina Western Railway was chartered by the South Carolina General Assembly in 1910. It built a 38-mile line from McBee, South Carolina, east to Florence, South Carolina in 1911. The South Carolina Western Railway Station at Darlington was completed the same year.  The following year, it built lines from Hartsville, South Carolina, to Sumter, South Carolina, and from Lydia, South Carolina, to Timmonsville, South Carolina.

The South Carolina Western was merged with the South Carolina Western Extension Railway and the Charleston Northern Railway into the North and South Carolina Railway in 1914 to form the Carolina, Atlantic and Western Railway.

References

Defunct South Carolina railroads
Predecessors of the Seaboard Air Line Railroad
Railway companies established in 1910
American companies established in 1910
Railway companies disestablished in 1914